The 2015 Louisville City FC season is the club's first season playing in Louisville, Kentucky in the United Soccer League (USL), in the third tier of the United States soccer league system.

Background 
The club was announced in 2014 when Orlando City relocated to Louisville, led by then-minority owner Wayne Estopinal and played their first season in 2015.

Squad information 
As of September 2, 2015

Competitions

Friendlies

United Soccer League 

All times in regular season on Eastern Daylight Time (UTC-04:00)

Results summary

Results

Standings 
Eastern Conference

Western Conference

USL Playoffs

Results

U.S. Open Cup 

Louisville City will enter the 2015 U.S. Open Cup with the rest of the United Soccer League in the second round.

Media 
As with the rest of the USL, all of Louisville City FC's USL matches will appear on YouTube.

See also 
 2015 in American soccer
 2015 USL season
 Louisville City FC
 Orlando City SC, Louisville City's Major League Soccer affiliate

References 

2015 USL season
2015
American soccer clubs 2015 season
2015 in sports in Kentucky